Jean-Baptiste Gustave Deloye (30 April 1838, Sedan - 17 February 1899,  Paris) was a French sculptor and medallist in the Neo-Baroque style.

Biography 
He was a student of François Jouffroy and Jean-Pierre Dantan at the École des beaux-arts de Paris. In 1862, he was awarded second place for sculpture in the Prix de Rome. He was a frequent exhibitor at the Salon and received several commissions for monuments from the French government.

His best known work is a monument to Giuseppe Garibaldi (1891), commissioned by the city of Nice, done from an original design by Antoine Étex.That same year, he contributed two bas-reliefs for a monument to  Juan Santamaría, a national hero of Costa Rica, in Alajuela, created by his friend Aristide Croisy.

In 1892, he was named a Knight in the Legion of Honor. He also created numerous decorative works at public buildings in Vienna, Rome and St. Petersburg and smaller figures for the Meissen Porcelain factory. His statue of Mark the Evangelist on a winged lion is on display at the Musée d'Orsay.

He is buried at L'Étang-la-Ville.

References

Further reading 
 Guillaume Peigné, Dictionnaire des sculpteurs néo-baroques français (1870-1914), CTHS (2012)

External links 

 « Deloye (Jean-Baptiste Gustave) », Notices nécrologiques des almanachs Matot-Braine .

1838 births
1899 deaths
French sculptors
French medallists
Recipients of the Legion of Honour
People from Sedan, Ardennes